Alexander Kinloch Samuel (born 20 September 1995) is a Welsh professional footballer who plays for Scottish Premiership club Ross County.

Samuel started his career in the youth academy at Aberystwyth Town, breaking into the first-team during the 2011–12 season. He joined Swansea City's academy in the summer of 2012. During his time at Swansea, he was loaned out to Greenock Morton and Newport County respectively. He signed for Stevenage ahead of the 2017–18 season, spending one season there before signing for Wycombe Wanderers of League One in August 2018. Samuel spent three years at Wycombe, helping the club earn promotion to the Championship during his time there, before joining Ross County on a free transfer in August 2021. He has also represented Wales at under-18 level.

Club career

Aberystwyth Town
Samuel started his career at Cymru Premier club Aberystwyth Town, progressing through the various youth levels at the club's academy. Whilst still playing in the academy at Aberystwyth, he briefly spent time at the club he supported, Swansea City, but travelling difficulties meant he returned to Aberystwyth's youth set-up. Samuel trained with the Aberystwyth first-team in the opening months of the 2011–12 season, whilst also competing for the club's under-16 team at the same time. He made his first-team debut for Aberystwyth two weeks after his 16th birthday, coming on as a 77th-minute substitute in a 2–0 away defeat to Llanelli Town on 8 October 2011. In his third first-team appearance, he came off the substitutes' bench to score a late equaliser in Aberystwyth's 1–1 Welsh Cup draw with Llandudno in January 2012. He played sporadically in the first-team for the remainder of the 2011–12 campaign, making nine appearances in all competitions and scoring once.

Swansea City and loan spells
Having been involved in regular first-team football at the age of 16, Samuel attracted transfer interest from several then-Premier League clubs, including Aston Villa, Manchester United, Newcastle United and Swansea City. He opted to join Swansea City, who he had briefly spent time at two years earlier, signing on a two-year scholarship in the summer of 2012. Samuel spent the next two seasons in the academy at Swansea before signing his first professional contract on 30 May 2014. During the 2014–15 season, he played regularly for the Swansea City under-21 team as they won the Professional Development League Two title that season. At the end of the season, in May 2015, he signed a new two-year contract extension to remain at Swansea until the summer of 2017.

Samuel was offered the chance to join Greenock Morton of the Scottish Championship on loan on transfer deadline day at the start of September 2015, an offer he stated he "knew straight away" that he wanted to take. He signed a four-month loan contract with Morton, with the deal running until January 2016. He made his Morton debut as a 78th-minute substitute for Romario Sabajo in a 4–2 away victory at Livingston on 5 September 2015. Samuel became a regular in the first-team for Morton, scoring his first two goals for the club in a 3–2 extra-time Scottish League Cup victory over Motherwell at Cappielow in his fourth appearance for the club. Samuel scored his first Scottish League goal in the Renfrewshire derby, scoring the equalising goal from close range in a 1–1 draw away at St Mirren on 20 November 2015. In January 2016, his loan agreement was extended for the rest of the 2015–16 season. A month later, he briefly returned to Swansea to receive treatment after sustaining a knee injury in a Development League West match against Queen's Park. The injury ultimately ruled Samuel out of action for a month, before returning to the Morton first-team as a late substitute in a 3–2 win over Queen of the South on 15 March 2016. He went on to play predominantly from the substitutes' bench for the remainder of the season, making 30 appearances and scoring four goals in all competitions during his time at Morton, with the club finishing in fifth place in the Scottish Championship.

Upon his return to Swansea, Samuel started the 2016–17 season playing regularly for the Swansea City under-23 team. He also made three appearances in the EFL Trophy for the under-23 team, scoring once in a 2–1 away victory at Newport County in a group-stage match in October 2016. Despite appearing for the under-23 team throughout the first half of the campaign, Samuel had made no first-team appearances for Swansea and was subsequently loaned out to League Two club Newport County on 13 January 2017, who he had scored against three months prior, on loan until the end of the season. Samuel made his Newport debut as a 29th-minute substitute in a 0–0 draw away at Barnet on 21 January 2017. His first three appearances for Newport were as a substitute, but he started every game he played in thereafter, scoring his first goal for the club in a 3–1 home defeat to Blackpool on 18 March 2017. A week later, he scored a late consolation goal in a narrow 2–1 defeat to Portsmouth at Fratton Park. Samuel made 18 appearances and scored twice during the five-month loan spell, as Newport avoided relegation after winning five of their last seven games to secure their League Two status for another year. He was named as the club's Player of the Year at the end of the season.

Stevenage
Samuel signed for League Two club Stevenage on a two-year deal on 9 May 2017, joining the Hertfordshire club on a free transfer. He made his Stevenage debut against his former club, Newport County, on the opening day of the 2017–18 season, playing the first 57 minutes in a 3–3 draw at Broadhall Way. Samuel scored his first goal for Stevenage in the club's 6–2 EFL Trophy defeat to Oxford United on 29 August 2017, capitalising on a slip in defence to score a late consolation. He scored two further goals in the EFL Trophy that season, both coming in Stevenage's home 3–1 win over Brighton & Hove Albion under-21s on 7 November 2017. Samuel made 28 appearances during the season, of which 16 were from the substitutes' bench, scoring four times, as a "mystery ankle injury" limited him to just five appearances during the second half of the 2017–18 campaign. He was released at the end of the season.

Wycombe Wanderers
Samuel underwent surgery on his ankle injury and was offered contracts by Newport County and Yeovil Town, which he turned down. He subsequently signed for newly promoted League One club Wycombe Wanderers on 23 August 2018, initially on a short-term contract until 20 January 2019. Wycombe manager Gareth Ainsworth stated he had signed Samuel after being impressed by his performance when Wycombe played Stevenage in December 2017. He made his debut as an 80th-minute substitute in the EFL Cup on 28 August 2018, replacing Adebayo Akinfenwa as Wycombe progressed via penalties against Forest Green Rovers. He scored his first goal for the club in a 2–1 win against Fulham under-21s at Adams Park in the EFL Trophy on 18 September 2018. A month later, on 27 October 2018, Samuel scored his first league goal for Wycombe, coming on as a 68th-minute substitute and scoring an injury-time consolation in a 3–2 defeat away at Walsall. Samuel signed a contract extension until June 2021 on 16 November 2018, with Wycombe manager Gareth Ainsworth praising the player's work ethic and character. He was a regular in the starting line-up in the Wycombe team during the 2018–19 season, scoring six goals in 36 games as Wycombe finished in 17th place in League One. Samuel was named as Wycombe's Young Player of the Year at the club's end-of-season awards ceremony.

A month into the 2019–20 season, Samuel signed a one-year contract extension on 5 September 2019, with the new agreement running until June 2022. An injury in a 1–0 defeat away to Gillingham later that month meant he did not play in the first-team again until November 2019. He made 27 appearances during the season, scoring four times. Included in this appearance tally were three appearances and one goal in the League One play-offs. Samuel played the opening 62 minutes of the final, which Wycombe won after defeating Oxford United 2–1 at Wembley Stadium on 13 July 2020. He made 23 appearances at Championship level during the 2020–21 season, scoring once, as Wycombe were relegated back to League One after finishing the season in 22nd place.

Ross County
Samuel signed for Scottish Premiership club Ross County on a two-year deal on 31 August 2021, joining on a free transfer after having his contract at Wycombe terminated by mutual consent.

International career
Samuel has played for Wales at under-18 level. He made his debut in a 2–1 victory against Republic of Ireland under-18s in February 2012, scoring the winning goal in the match.

Career statistics

Honours
Wycombe Wanderers
EFL League One play-offs: 2020

Individual
Newport County Player of the Year: 2016–17

References

External links

1995 births
Living people
Footballers from Neath
Welsh footballers
Wales youth international footballers
Association football forwards
Aberystwyth Town F.C. players
Swansea City A.F.C. players
Greenock Morton F.C. players
Newport County A.F.C. players
Stevenage F.C. players
Wycombe Wanderers F.C. players
Ross County F.C. players
Cymru Premier players
Scottish Professional Football League players
English Football League players